JaCiva's Bakery and Chocolatier is a bakery and chocolate shop in Portland, Oregon.

Description
JaCiva's is a bakery and chocolate shop on Hawthorne Boulevard in southeast Portland's Sunnyside neighborhood. The shop has a small private event space and a dessert house called After Dark, which specializes in chocolates, cakes, and tortes. JaCiva's offers pastries, cheesecake, coffee cake, truffles, and other "interestingly shaped" chocolates.

History

Jack and Iva Elmer co-founded the bakery in December 1986. The couple's daughters operated the business after Jack suffered a stroke in 1990. Iva helped coordinate the temporary installation of American flags along Hawthorne Boulevard at certain times of the year.

Jack died in 2014 at the age of 75. One of his surviving daughters wrote, "He was loved and will be missed greatly."

During the COVID-19 pandemic, the business had a take-out window and drive-through operation. Face masks were required even after Oregon's mandate ended, as of March 2022.

See also
 List of bakeries
 List of chocolatiers

References

External links

 
 
 JaCiva's Chocolates at Zomato

1986 establishments in Oregon
Bakeries of Oregon
Chocolate companies
Restaurants established in 1986
Restaurants in Portland, Oregon
Sunnyside, Portland, Oregon